The flag of Christmas Island was unofficially adopted in 1986 after being chosen the winner in a competition for a flag for the territory.  It was designed by Tony Couch of Sydney, Australia. The flag was made official in 2002 on Australia Day, when the administrator of the territory, Bill Taylor, presented the flag to the Christmas Island Shire.

Design
The flag of Christmas Island consists of a green and blue background, split from the top left corner to the bottom right. These colours are intended to represent the land and sea respectively. The Southern Cross constellation appears in the bottom left of the flag similar to the flag of Australia. In the top right, the golden bosun bird (Phaethon lepturus fulvus, one of six subspecies of the white-tailed tropicbird) appears. It is considered to be a symbol of the Island. The last motif appears in the centre of the flag on a golden disc is the map of the island in green. The disc itself was originally only included to offset the green colour of the map, but has become linked to the mining industry.

History

Creation
In 1986, the Christmas Island Assembly announced a competition to design both a flag and a coat of arms for the territory. There was a prize fund of $100, and some 69 entries were submitted. The winning submission was created by Tony Couch, a resident of Sydney who had previously worked on Christmas Island. The new flag was announced on 14 April 1986, by the Christmas Island Assembly.

Implementation
The first attempt to make the flag official occurred in 1995 when the Minister of the Islands at the time took the view that implementation could take place on Australia Day 1996 via a formal announcement by the Administrator rather than an amendment to the Christmas Island Act 1958. Although this was agreed, the declaration never took place.

Subsequently, Christmas Island official Gary Dunt revived the issue in 2001 and the flag was formally declared the official flag of Christmas Island on Australia Day 2002 (26 January), by the administrator of the territory, Bill Taylor. Councillor Mariam Kawi accepted the flag as a representative of the Shire of Christmas Island.

References

External links

 Christmas Island at Ausflag
 

2002 establishments in Australia
Flags introduced in 2002
Flags of Australian states and territories
Flag
Southern Cross flags
Flags adopted through competition
Flags displaying animals